Solovey or Solovei ("nightingale" in East Slavic languages) may refer to:

 Solovey (surname)
 Solovei the Brigand (Nightingale the Robber), a figure in Slavic folklore

Music
Solovey (Alyabyev song), best known composition by Alexander Alexandrov Alyabyev (1787-1851).
 Solovey (Go_A song), Ukrainian Eurovision song.

See also
 
 
 Soloway (disambiguation)